Desulfosarcina alkanivorans is a hydrocarbon-degrading bacterium from the genus of Desulfosarcina which has been isolated from oil contaminated marine sediments from Shuaiba in Kuwait.

References

External links
Type strain of Desulfosarcina alkanivorans at BacDive -  the Bacterial Diversity Metadatabase

Desulfobacterales
Bacteria described in 2017